Forsterygion capito (genbank common name: spotted robust triplefin) is a species of triplefin blenny in the genus Forsterygion. It was described by Jenyns in 1842. This species is endemic to New Zealand where it occurs around the North and South Islands, Stewart Island, Auckland Islands, Snares Islands, Antipodes Islands and Chatham Islands. The adults occur along sheltered coastal reefs and in harbours and bays with substrates consisting of rock and shell. They prey on small benthic animals which are swallowed whole.

References

Forsterygion
Fish described in 1842